NRK P3 Pyro is a Norwegian internet-based music radio station within the Norwegian Broadcasting Corporation, which profiles itself with the "hardest parts" of rock music, "from The Who to Morbid Angel". The channel had its origin in NRK P3.  Leaders of the radio station are Asbjørn Slettemark and Totto Mjelde.

External links 
 NRK P3 Pyro website 
 NRK P3 Pyro (Internet radio)
 

NRK
Radio stations in Norway